Rodrigo Diego Lopez (born 2 December 1996) is a Mexican diver. He competed in the men's three metre springboard event at the 2016 Summer Olympics.

References

1996 births
Living people
Mexican male divers
Olympic divers of Mexico
Divers at the 2016 Summer Olympics
Place of birth missing (living people)
Divers at the 2014 Summer Youth Olympics